The Lebanon Historic Commercial District in Lebanon, Kentucky is a  historic district which was listed on the National Register of Historic Places in 1987.  It included 32 contributing buildings.

It includes:

Marion County Courthouse (1935), a Classical Revival courthouse designed by architect Thomas Nolen, a Works Progress Administration project
a U.S. post office designed by James Knox Taylor, 
the City Hall (1876)
Arista Theater (c.1935), an Art Deco theatre
"the important and rare mid-nineteenth century Court Square, a grouping of one-and two-story, mid-nineteenth to early twentieth-century professional offices
surrounding the courthouse and forming an indentation in the south side of Main Street."

References

National Register of Historic Places in Marion County, Kentucky
Italianate architecture in Kentucky
Neoclassical architecture in Kentucky
Art Deco architecture in Kentucky
Buildings and structures completed in 1850
Courthouses in Kentucky
Commercial buildings on the National Register of Historic Places in Kentucky
Lebanon, Kentucky